The Estadio Gran Parque Central is the stadium of Club Nacional de Football. It is located in Montevideo, Uruguay, near Nacional headquarters (exactly between the streets Carlos Anaya, Jaime Cibils, General Urquiza and Comandante Braga), in the La Blanqueada neighbourhood.

Due to various factors, it is considered a historical stadium. Built in 1900, it is the oldest current stadium in America and the fifteenth in the world. But it mainly stands out for having hosted the 1930 FIFA World Cup, playing one of the first two matches in the history of the competition, when on 13 July 1930 United States defeated Belgium 3–0 in Group D. FIFA remembered this fact when in 2005 a delegation headed by its president, Joseph Blatter, came to visit the reforms and placed a commemorative plaque at the stadium. This historical fact was remembered by FIFA on two occasions: 1987 and 2005.

In addition, the stadium was also the venue for the Uruguay national team, both in soccer and in other disciplines. Since its creation and until 1930, it was the main sports arena in Uruguay, so until the inauguration of the Centenario Stadium, the Uruguayan team officiated as a local in the Gran Parque Central. It was also the venue for other important international tournaments, like the 1923 and 1924 South American Championships (current Copa América), the 2015 South American U-20 Championship or the 2021 Women's Copa Libertadores final.

Together with the Centenario Stadium, it is the Uruguayan stadium with the best artificial light, after a reform carried out in 2021. It is also, after the Centenario, the stadium in which the Uruguayan soccer team has played more official matches. In addition, on 31 October 2018, it was the stadium to register the highest ticket sales for a stadium in Uruguay without being the Centenario, selling the 34,000 tickets available.

Since the end of 2012, Nacional promotes the inclusion of the Gran Parque Central as the second stadium of the Montevideo headquarters for Uruguay's candidacy with a view to the realization of a world future in 2030. The argument that will be presented for FIFA to approve the tricolor request It will be the history of the sports scene as the first World Cup stadium.

History
The Estadio Gran Parque Central is an important landmark in the history of Uruguay, not only because of its relevance in sports, but also for its bonds with the rich history of Uruguayans and their patriotic feelings.

Before the existence of Parque Central as a sports ground, in exactly the same location (which used to be known as "Quinta de la Paraguaya"), Uruguay's national hero José Artigas was named Jefe de los Orientales (leader of the Uruguayan people) in 1811.

The beginnings

The Parque Central was opened for the practice of sports in 1900, having been the site of Montevideo's bullring until the abolition of this activity. At first, the tenants of the stadium were Deutscher Fussball Klub for their home games at the first Uruguayan league championship in the 1900s. As a sports stadium, the Parque Central was inaugurated on March 25, 1900 with a match between the Deutscher Fussball Klub and the CURCC (Central Uruguay Railway Cricket Club). The final score was CURCC 2 – Deutscher 0. Before the game, a lunch was served at Hotel Lanata, among personalities from the Government and leaders of the clubs. According to some chronicles from that period, the inauguration included the Don Bosco Band and the "Flora" gunship Band. There was also a special highlight with a Scottish skirt dancer who took the 7,000 people present by surprise, as they were unaware of the Scottish traditions.
Two days after Nacional would meet the Deutscher F. K. in a game that ended 1–1.

The land was the property of "Tranvias a la Union y Maroñas", a German streetcar company whose employees were the founders of the Deutscher F. K. The venue consisted of four tennis courts and two football fields. By 1901,the streetcar company conceded Nacional the second field as they entered the AUF league. From that year until now, the Estadio Gran Parque Central has witnessed several championships won by Nacional (the last one in 2010/2011 season) and  Uruguay national football team.

Many parts of the stadium remain unchanged since 1900, like the old "Mirador" located behind the Tribuna Atilio García stand, although the current pitch is different from the one of the beginning of the past century. The current orientation is east-west, opposite to the first one that was north-south, and there was another field in the actual place of the east stands and eastern part of the pitch.

Until 1930, the Parque Central was the main sports venue in Uruguay. It was only with the building of the Estadio Centenario that Nacional's stadium was superseded.

Time of modernization

The 2003 reform allowed its reopening in 2005. In this year, through the efforts of Nacional fans and the sale of modern, special seats in the Tribuna José María Delgado stand, the Estadio Gran Parque Central was remodelled once again. The aim of this remodelling was to meet international football standards, which would allow Nacional to play home games for the Uruguayan Championship and the Copa Libertadores at its historic stadium. Over the years, the stadium began to be expanded, going from 20,000 people to a capacity of 34,000 spectators, constantly growing. This increase in capacity is accompanied by works to modernize its facilities, which allowed the team to no longer have to leave the tricolor stage for any kind of event.

These changes allowed the Gran Parque Central to host the 2015 South American Under-20 tournament, the 2021 Women's Copa Libertadores final and other events, both sporting and musical. In turn, in recent years it was requested as a training ground for different teams and international teams.

Together with the Centenario Stadium, it is the Uruguayan stadium with the best artificial light, with lighting of 1,500 lux, after a renovation carried out in 2021. In addition, in 2022, the stadium installed a modern giant screen 15.8 meters long by 5.2 meters high, being the screen with the largest inch in the entire country.

The present capacity is 34.000, but in following years it is expected to expand to 40.000 (this extension would help in the intention of Nacional to include it as a venue of the future FIFA World Cup in 2030).

Remodellings

Burnt almost completely after the fire of 1911,it was rebuilt a couple of years later. The second remodelling of the Estadio Gran Parque Central took place in 1944. On that occasion, improvements of the pitch and the four stands were made, and more seats were added in the main stand, Tribuna José María Delgado.

Thirty years later, the Parque Central was remodelled once again due to a fire that destroyed part of the stadium.

Acknowledgements

The Gran Parque Central stadium is commonly called by the Tricolor supporters as the first World Cup stadium. In this regard, the Tricolor Temple has received several awards, like a plaque placed by FIFA in 2005 commemorating the celebration in this stadium of the first match in the history of the FIFA World Cups.

For the occasion, a FIFA delegation came to visit the works, led by its president, JOseph Blatter, with Eugenio Figueredo, Nicolás Leoz, Ricardo Texeira and Julio Grondona.

Years later, another FIFA delegation, headed by its president Gianni Infantino, visited the Gran Parque Central stadium, emphasizing that "it is a World Cup Stadium, pure history" and that "when you are in such a historic place it is a very emotional strong".

Major international tournaments 
The Gran Parque Central stadium hosted several international sporting events. Regarding competitions with national teams, the Nacional stadium hosted some tournaments, highlighting the 1923 South American Championship, the 1924 South American Championship, the 1930 FIFA World Cup or the 2015 U20 South American Championship. In the case of the Championships South American (currently known as Copa América), the Gran Parque Central was the only venue, while in the 1930 World Cup and in the 2015 South American it hosted some matches. During the 1930 World Cup, teams such as Argentina and Brazil made their World Cup debuts at this stadium.

This stadium was the headquarters of the Uruguay national team, both in soccer and in other sports. Until 1930 it was the main sports arena in Uruguay, recently surpassed by the Estadio Centenario, so until the inauguration of the Estadio Centenario, Parque Central was the stadium where Uruguay played its home games. In recent years, the Uruguayan rugby team played some matches here too. It is also common for foreign teams to opt for this stadium as a training camp prior to international matches.

The Uruguay national football team has never lost a game in international tournaments in the Gran parque Central stadium.

1923 Copa América 
During the 1923 Copa América, the stadium hosted all the matches:

1924 Copa América 
During the 1924 Copa América, the stadium hosted all the matches:

1930 FIFA World Cup 
During the 1930 FIFA World Cup, the stadium hosted six matches:

Major games

2021 Copa Libertadores Femenina 
Conmebol determined that the tournament would have the final match in the Gran Parque Central stadium, in Uruguay:

Concerts

References

External links 

 
 Tour Virtual en 360° del Parque Central - Uruguay360.com.uy

Club Nacional de Football
Sports venues completed in 1900
1930 FIFA World Cup stadiums
Gran Parque Central
Copa América stadiums
La Blanqueada